John Linwood Fox (April 2, 1907 – April 6, 1954), or Tiger Jack Fox as he was better known, was a colorful, hard punching, American light heavyweight boxer.  Fox fought from 1928 to 1950.

Boxing career
Fox claimed he got his start in boxing when he was picked up, while hitchhiking in Georgia, by boxer Young Stribling.  At that time, Stribling was travelling from town to town and engaging in boxing matches, basically meeting all comers.  Stribling offered Fox a job as a sparring partner.  Although he had no experience, Fox, out of work and hungry, accepted the offer.

His first sparring session with Stribling almost ended his boxing career.  Stribling toyed with him, and eventually knocked him senseless with a right hand to the jaw.  Fox claimed he didn't sleep that night, re-living the events of the day, and studying how to avoid a similar fate the next day. Fox concluded that if he stepped forward when Stribling threw his right, he would be inside the punch and in position to hit Stribling with his left.

The next day, the two sparred again.  This time when Stribling threw his right, Fox was waiting and executed his manoeuvre to perfection.  Surprised by Fox's left hook, Stribling's knees buckled.  Fox then jumped in and hit him with another left hook, which sent Stribling to the canvas.  Although he was fired on the spot, Fox thought that if he could knock Stribling down, he could hold his own with anyone.

Fox then made his way to Indianopolis, where he hung around a boxing gym until he was offered a fight.  Fox accepted and was on his way. He relocated in Terre Haute, Indiana to train under bantamweight champion Bud Taylor and became the "Indiana colored heavyweight champion." He fought frequently for the next nine years without losing a bout.  His first loss was by a split decision to light heavyweight champion Maxie Rosenbloom.  Fox claimed he engaged in over 300 fights, but many were not recorded.  He claimed that he never fought a preliminary bout in his career, just main events.

Fox was defeated by Melio Bettina in his only crack at the light heavyweight championship, NYSAC version.  In this elimination bout to name a champion, Fox was stopped in the 9th round.  Two months before the fight he was stabbed near the heart in a Harlem hotel in a dispute over a woman.

Fox also fought and knocked out in two rounds former light-heavyweight champion Bob Olin, and he knocked out Lou Brouillard in seven.  He was kayoed in three rounds by future lightheavyweight champion John Henry Lewis.

Two of Fox's more surprising victories came against future heavyweight champion Jersey Joe Walcott. On May 12, 1937, Fox knocked out Walcott in the 8th round.  In the following year Fox again defeated Walcott, this time by a  ten-round decision.

Fox is second on the all-time list for first-round knockouts, and was named to the Ring Magazine's list of 100 greatest punchers of all time.

Professional boxing record
All information in this section is derived from BoxRec, unless otherwise stated.

Official record

All newspaper decisions are officially regarded as “no decision” bouts and are not counted in the win/loss/draw column.

Unofficial record

Record with the inclusion of newspaper decisions in the win/loss/draw column.

References

External links
 

1907 births
1954 deaths
Boxers from Washington (state)
Light-heavyweight boxers
Sportspeople from Spokane, Washington
American male boxers